Pat Ingoldsby (born 25 August 1942 in Malahide, Dublin, Ireland) is an Irish poet and TV presenter. He has hosted children's TV shows, written plays for the stage and for radio, published books of short stories and been a newspaper columnist. Since the mid-1990s, he has withdrawn from the mass media and is most widely known for his collections of poetry, and his selling of them on the streets of Dublin (usually on Westmoreland Street or College Green).

Work

In the 1980s, Pat hosted RTÉ children's TV shows named Pat's Hat, Pat's Chat, and Pat's Pals. His plays include Bats or Booze or Both (Dublin, Project Arts Centre, 1977); Hisself (Dublin, Peacock Theatre, 1978); Rhymin' Simon (Peacock Theatre, 1978); When Am I Getting' Me Clothes (Peacock Theatre, 1978); Yeukface the Yeuk and the Spotty Grousler (Peacock, 1982); and The Full Shilling (Dublin, Gaeity Theatre, 1986). In the early 1990s, he had a column in the Evening Press (a now-defunct national Irish newspaper). These columns were later collected in The Peculiar Sensation of Being Irish. Ingoldsby is a fluent Irish speaker and includes a few poems written in Irish in each book of poetry. He lives in Clontarf, in Dublin, Ireland. Since sometime in the mid-1990s, he has withdrawn from TV, radio and theatre, instead devoting his efforts to poetry. Pat is still part of Ireland's arts scene, sometimes opening Art exhibitions, introducing then-new musicians such as David Gray or launching other people's books. He self-publishes through Willow Publications, which he set up and named after one of his pet cats (who later died). Some of his books since 1998 have carried a note that they are protected by the "Bratislava Accord 1993, section 2 cre/009 manifest-minsk", the terms of which allegedly protect his book's content from being included in:
 school textbooks
 examinations
 elocution classes
 anything with the word "Arts" in it.

In March 2022, the Museum of Literature Ireland (MoLI) hosted a video installation to mark the release of Ingoldsby's latest anthology, In Dublin They Really Tell You Things — Pat Ingoldsby, Selected Poems 1986 — 2021.

Influences

Most of Pat's poems are about his personal experiences, observations of life in Dublin, or mildly surreal humorous possibilities. Topics of personal experiences vary from the death of his father, or the electroconvulsive therapy he received (c. 1988), to his appreciation of the natural world or his pets (mostly cats, but also some fish). Observations of Dublin are mostly humorous conversations overheard on the bus, or the characters he sees and talks to while selling his books on the streets.  Some observations are not so cheerful as he also sees the drunks and the homeless of Dublin city, and the some aspects of modernisation which he isn't pleased with. His most distinctive style of poetry is his humorist style. A recurring character, Wesley Quench, appears in roles such as the driver of a Flying See-Saw Brigade.  Another poem, "Vagina in the Vatican," depicts a vagina sneaking into the Vatican unstopped because no one knew what it was – except for a few who couldn't let slip that they did. He also occasionally produces stories for children. These are a childish version of his mildly surreal style. During the rapid increase in the use of mobile telephones, he offered a "Mobile Phone Euthanasia" services on the streets of Dublin, where he would destroy phones for annoyed owners. His cousin Maeve Ingoldsby is a playwright. Pat retired from selling his books on the streets of Dublin in 2015.

Bibliography

Poetry
 You've Just Finished Reading This Title
 Rhyme Doesn't With Reason
 Up The Leg of Your Jacket
 Welcome to My Head (Please Remove Your Boots) (1986)
 Salty Water (1988)
  Scandal Sisters (1990)
 How Was It For You Doctor? (1994)
 Poems So Fresh And So New ...Yahoo! (1995)
 If You Don't Tell Anybody I Won't (1996)
 See Liz She Spins (1997)
 Half A Hug (1998)
 Beautiful Cracked Eyes (1999)
 The Blue E-Tee Wet! (2000)
 Do Lámh I Mo Bhrístí (2001)
 The Frenchwoman and the Sky (2003)
 Once Upon A 'hide (2004)
 I'm Out Here (2005)
 Can I Get in the Bath? (2007)
 Once Upon A Wicked Eye (2008)
 I Thought You Died Years Ago (2009)
 Hitting Cows with a Banjo (2011)
 Pawmarks on My Poems (2013)
 Mise MacGiolla (2017) 
 In Dublin They Really Tell You Things (Selected poems, 2022)

Other works

For adults
 Hisself (Play, Peacock Theatre, Dublin)
 When am I Gettin' Me Clothes (Play, Peacock Theatre, Dublin) (Later adapted for radio play on RTÉ Radio 1)
 The Dark Days of Denny Lacey (radio play, RTÉ Radio 1)
 She Came Up From the Sea (radio play, RTÉ Radio 1)
 Fire Is Far Enough (radio play, RTÉ Radio 1)
 Liffey Ever Is (radio play, RTÉ Radio 1)
 The Peculiar Sensation of Being Irish (short stories) (1995) 
 Laugh Without Prejudice (short stories) (1996) 
 My Own Voice (Audio CD of Pat reading some poems)
 Let Me into Your Ear (Audio CD of Pat reading more of his poems)

For children

 Zaney Tales (short stories book)
 Rhymin' Simon (Play)
 Yeukface the Yeuk and the Spotty Grousler (Play)
 Tell Me A Story Pat (Audio Tape)

Ingoldsby also wrote some episodes of Wanderly Wagon

Filmography
 The Peculiar Sensation of Being Pat Ingoldsby, a 2022 documentary by film director Seamus Murphy on the life and works of Pat Ingoldsby (produced by Broadstone Films, Dublin).

External links
 Official website
 Bio at Irish Playography
 RTÉ Radio 1, "One Potato, Two Potato, Three" In what is now an oral history of Dublin, Pat Ingoldsby records children playing street games and singing songs (Broadcast 1977)
 Where is Pat?

Weak links
Since Pat withdrew from the media spotlight before the blossoming of the Internet, it can be hard to find information about him and his work.  The following links contains small bits of information.

References

1942 births
Living people
Irish children's television presenters
Irish children's writers
Irish columnists
Irish male poets
Irish male dramatists and playwrights
Writers from Dublin (city)
RTÉ television presenters
20th-century Irish dramatists and playwrights
21st-century Irish dramatists and playwrights
20th-century Irish poets
21st-century Irish poets
20th-century Irish male writers
21st-century Irish male writers
Television personalities from Dublin (city)